Three ships of the Royal Navy have borne the name HMS Narwhal, after the marine mammal, the narwhal:

  was an  launched in 1915. She was involved in a collision in 1919 that broke her back, and was broken up in 1920.
  was a  launched in 1935 and lost to an unknown cause in 1940. found in 2017
  was a Porpoise-class submarine launched in 1957 and sunk as a target in 1983.

Royal Navy ship names